A. B. M. Khairul Haque (born 18 May 1944) is a Bangladeshi jurist, who served as the 19th Chief Justice of Bangladesh and the current chief of Bangladesh Law Commission. Acclaimed for delivering verdicts in the Bengali language, he played a pivotal role to implement Bengali in the Supreme Court of Bangladesh.

Career
Haque delivered the verdict which declared the Caretaker Government illegal and unconstitutional. He was made Chairman of Law Commission on 23 June 2013 for a term of three years. He called for trial of Pakistani soldiers for war crimes committed during Bangladesh Liberation War.

Leading Judgments 

 Abdul Mannan Khan v Government of Bangladesh (declaring caretaker government unconstitutional)
 Siddiq Ahmed v Bangladesh
 Bangladesh Italian Marble Works v Government of Bangladesh

References

1944 births
Living people
University of Dhaka alumni
Chief justices of Bangladesh
Supreme Court of Bangladesh justices
Honorary Fellows of Bangla Academy
Place of birth missing (living people)